Bayamón is a rapid transit station in the San Juan agglomeration, Puerto Rico. It is the western terminus of the Tren Urbano system, located after Deportivo station. The station is located in Bayamón, just outside of its downtown (Bayamón Pueblo). The trial service ran in 2004, however, the regular service only started on 6 June 2005.

Nearby 
 Bayamón City Hall
 Bayamón Pueblo
 Invención de la Santa Cruz parish church and the town's main plaza
 Francisco Oller Museum
 Bayamón Health Center
 Estrella del Norte Park
 Universidad Metropolitana de Bayamón

References

Tren Urbano stations
Railway stations in the United States opened in 2004
2004 establishments in Puerto Rico